Harbor City International School, also known as Harbor City or HCIS, is a charter secondary school in Duluth, Minnesota, United States, that opened in fall 2002. It serves students in grades nine through twelve. The school is governed by an eight-member board of directors.

History
The school opened in 2002 on the third floor of a 19th-century plumbing supply warehouse in downtown Duluth, which was renovated to provide expandable instructional spaces, "cave" and "get away" spaces, and support for project-based learning. The adaptation received a 2002 DesignShare Award. Two years later the school expanded onto the fourth floor and doubled its enrollment to about 200, and in 2008, with the assistance of a grant, added performance space on the second floor.

Demographics
The demographic breakdown of the 231 students enrolled in 201718 was:
Male - 47.2%
Female - 52.8%
Native American/Alaskan - 3.9%
Asian - 3.5%
Black - 3.9%
Hispanic - 2.6%
White - 82.2%
Multiracial - 3.9%

34.2% of the students were eligible for free or reduced-cost lunch. For 201718, this was a Title I school.

References

External links

Public high schools in Minnesota
High schools in Duluth, Minnesota
Educational institutions established in 2002
Charter schools in Minnesota
2002 establishments in Minnesota